Theron Joseph Rubley (born June 19, 1968), is a former American professional gridiron football player who was a quarterback in the National Football League (NFL), World League of American Football (WLAF), and the Canadian Football League (CFL) during the 1990s. He played for the Los Angeles Rams, Green Bay Packers, and Denver Broncos of the NFL, the Rhein Fire of the WLAF, and the Winnipeg Blue Bombers and Hamilton Tiger-Cats of the CFL.

Early years
Rubley was a first-team all-state selection for Davenport West High School in Davenport, Iowa, where he completed 253 of 490 passes (51.6 percent) for 4,009 yards and 32 touchdowns in three seasons from 1984 to 1986.

College career
Rubley played collegiately at the University of Tulsa in 47 games from 1987 to 1991. During his career, he threw for 9,324 yards and 73 touchdowns, while also being intercepted 54 times. Rubley added 1 rushing touchdown as well. In his time with Tulsa, the Golden Hurricane posted a 26-31 record, culminating with a 10-2 season in 1991 and victory in the Freedom Bowl over San Diego State. During his final college season, Rubley compiled a career-best 139.2 efficiency rating, good enough for sixteenth in the nation.

Professional career
Rubley was selected by the Los Angeles Rams in the ninth round (228th pick overall) of the 1992 NFL Draft. He spent his rookie season as the team's inactive third quarterback.

Rubley saw action in two NFL seasons in 1993 and 1995. He started seven games for the Rams during the 1993 season. With limited playing time and being waived numerous times by NFL teams, Rubley found success with the Rhein Fire of the WLAF and played briefly with Hamilton Tiger-Cats and Winnipeg Blue Bombers of the CFL.

His most infamous NFL moment, leading to his being cut from the team, came as a Green Bay Packer in a 1995 game against the Minnesota Vikings.  Both starting quarterback Brett Favre and back-up quarterback Ty Detmer got injured in the game, but the Packers and Vikings were tied 24–24 with less than a minute to go and the Packers with the ball on the Minnesota 38-yard line.

On 3rd-and-1, coach Mike Holmgren called for a quarterback sneak. However, Rubley, the only remaining quarterback for the Packers, audibled and called a roll-out.  He passed the ball and it was quickly intercepted, giving Minnesota the ball and eventually, the win.

After the game, an incredulous Holmgren commented, "I called a quarterback sneak. He [Rubley] changed the play. He thought he had the choice." Packers General Manager Ron Wolf was equally livid, commenting, "I can't believe this. I think we've exhausted ways to lose here." Rubley himself said, "It was not a real good decision." Rubley was cut later that week, and never appeared in another NFL game, although he was on the Denver Broncos roster the following season.

Post-football career
Rubley served as a consultant for the film The Replacements, specifically coaching Keanu Reeves in his role as the starting quarterback for the fictional Washington Sentinels. Reeves' character, Shane Falco, is loosely based on Rubley.

References

External links
 Pro-Football-Reference.com

1968 births
Living people
American football quarterbacks
American players of Canadian football
Canadian football quarterbacks
Green Bay Packers players
Hamilton Tiger-Cats players
Los Angeles Rams players
Sportspeople from Davenport, Iowa
Players of American football from Iowa
Rhein Fire players
Tulsa Golden Hurricane football players
Winnipeg Blue Bombers players